Susan Standring, PhD, DSc, MBE (2015), is Professor Emeritus of Experimental Neurobiology, former Head, Division of Anatomy, Cell and Human Biology, Guy's King's and St. Thomas' School of Biomedical Sciences, King's College London, London, editor-in-chief of Gray's Anatomy. President of the Anatomical Society for 2008–2010. In addition to educating medical and dental students in anatomy for over forty years, Standring has led an extensive research career, publishing over 150 papers.

Education
Standring began her education studying medicine at Guy's Hospital Medical School in 1964 before switching to pursue a PhD.

Career
After completing her PhD, Standring worked as a neuroscientist, publishing over 150 articles relating to her research on repair of the peripheral nervous system. Standring is a past President of the Peripheral Nerve Society and of the Anatomical Society. Early in her career, Standring was assigned the job of creating a bibliography for 36th edition of Gray's Anatomy, after having suggested the idea to her colleague, and then editor of the book, Peter Williams. Having completed her work on the bibliography, Standring then edited the peripheral nerve section of the following edition before being promoted to editor-in-chief of the 39th edition. Standring still holds this position today, and has moved the text forward, introducing new online editions and incorporating interactive and motion based graphic to further demonstrate and aid in teaching of the complexity of many structure processes. During her career as an anatomist Standring has spent over 40 years teaching anatomy to medical and dental students.

Standring also served as an Admissions Tutor for Medicine for seven years at UMDS and King's College London, helping to develop the Access to Medicine Programme at King's College, which aims to expand access to healthcare professions for students studying at less selective state schools in the Greater London area or who participate in the Realizing Opportunities program of England. Through this work she later served as an advisor in the development of similar programs at the Universities of Bradford and Southampton.

In addition to her work as editor-in-chief of Gray's Anatomy, she continues to write on applied anatomical topics and on the histories of topographical anatomy and of peripheral nerve repair.
Standring currently acts as an external examiner of anatomy to several UK medical schools and is a Trustee of the Hunterian Collection at the Royal College of Surgeons of England and previously presided on the Council of the Hunterian Society. Standring is also an Honorary Fellow of the Royal College of Surgeons of England and has been a Trustee of the Damiliola Taylor Trust and of Changing Faces.

Research
Standring's research career has produced over 150 articles. A large part of her research consisted of nerve work, which would lead to her initial involvement in Gray's Anatomy. Her more recent works has involved contributions to nerve communication and anomalies that have been studied through neck dissections. Standring's work has led to the discovery of nerve variants including that of the hypoglossal nerve, anatomical variants of other branches of the cervical plexus, and the marginal mandibular nerve. Such discoveries will have implications involving operations on the neck and face. Standring has also contributed to work on nerve regeneration and nerve repair, specifically in the book Peripheral Neuropathy (2005). In retirement Standring continues to write on applied anatomical topics and on the histories of topographical anatomy and of nerve repair.

References

British neuroscientists
British women neuroscientists
Academics of King's College London
Members of the Order of the British Empire
British women biologists
Living people
Year of birth missing (living people)
Fellows of King's College London